The Oregon Bicycle Racing Association is a bicycle racing organization based in the U.S. state of Oregon.

Mission
The mission of OBRA is to promote and develop the sport of bicycle racing in Oregon by providing the tools and resources necessary for competition.

History

Foundation 

The Oregon Bicycle Racing Association (OBRA) was started in the late 1970s. Called the Oregon Cycling Association (OCA), it was then the district association of USCF clubs. The name was changed to the Oregon Bicycle Racing Association several years later to avoid confusion with the political group, the Oregon Citizens Alliance which was getting much negative media attention. 

There was not much activity for the first few years after OCA was formed. When Steve Scarich became the District Representative he pushed to increase the strength of the organization. Organization was improved and a system of collecting fees from races was established. A few years later Mike Murray was elected to the board. Murray wanted more racing in Oregon so he turned the focus of the group toward making it easier to produce quality events. He bought traffic signs, photo finish equipment, PA systems, CB radios and more.

Separation from USCF 
Dissatisfaction with the United States Cycling Federation came on slowly and climaxed in December 1998 when the USCF fired all Regional
Representatives in favor of a plan to utilize 10 people nationwide to service the membership. At this same time alternatives to the insurance provided by the national governing body became more readily available and the question was asked, 'What is OBRA getting back for the dollars that are sent to Colorado Springs?' An annual membership ranged from $35 to $50 and then the charge for insurance was about twice what was available commercially. OBRA leadership figured that Oregon alone was sending about $200,000 annually to USAC in USCF and NORBA membership fees and race permits and surcharges. In exchange OBRA received little in the way of services and soon their local representation would be eliminated. When USA Cycling doubled the permit fees for weekend day series races, OBRA leadership sent a message to Colorado Springs that Oregon series promoters would choose to insure with an insurance plan purchased by OBRA and to forgo USCF sanctioning. Letters were sent to every USAC board director and staff member explaining why OBRA were doing this and further explaining that it was likely that all Oregon events would do this unless USAC made changes to address concerns over the diminishing level of service. Only one response from USAC was received. 

In the fall of 1998 there was a vote of member clubs that was unanimous that the OBRA insurance plan would be offered at all events.

Success 
OBRA membership has swelled to the highest levels ever when David Beede contacted OBRA about branching out into mountain bike racing. The dissatisfaction among NORBA members was even greater than that from the road/track side. Last year they were able to organize a race series amongst the mountain bike races and added them to OBRAs email network. This has given them a voice that they have not experienced before.

Now other states have followed their lead. American Bicycle Racing (ABR) in the Midwest, Bicycle Racing Association of Colorado (BRAC - which has now changed its name to American Cycling Association) represent Colorado, Arizona, New Mexico, Texas and parts of Texas and North California/Nevada Cycling Association (NCNCA) have all formed a coalition of association-
Federation of Independent Cycling Associations (FIAC). OBRA has started incorporation proceedings and are working toward a shared rulebook and rider reciprocity. The OBRA 2000 calendar has over 200 days of racing, offering discounted membership to juniors and strongly suggest that the race organizers reduce entry fees for those under 18. The Best All round Competition has expanded to recognize the outstanding performances in each discipline and new for 2000 OBRA are hosting an Oregon Cup.

Statistics 

According to OBRA statistics, membership has grown dramatically since 2000.  
2000- 1738 members
2001- 1741 members
2002- 1978 members
2003- 2335 members
2004- 2760 members
2005- 2828 members
2006- 3296 members, 1014 1-day memberships   

According to Velonews (2006)
 Oregon was ranked #2 in the number of cycling events, only 8 races behind California.  
 Oregon was ranked #3 in the number of amateur racers, behind only California and Colorado.  
 Oregon was ranked #1 in terms of the percentage of riders vs. state population with Colorado coming in over 50% lower in 2nd place.

Notable current and former members 
Chris Horner winner of the 2013 Vuelta a España
Ryan Trebon mountain bike national champion and 2-time cyclocross national champion
Jacob Rathe retired professional road cyclist who rode for 
Clara Honsinger of Cannondale–Cyclocrossworld.com and EF Education–Tibco–SVB - 2019 Cyclocross Elite Women USA National Champ
Inga Thompson former board member and 10-time national champion and 3-time Olympian

Organization

Governance 
The Oregon Bicycle Racing Association is an Oregon Non Profit Corporation that has its Constitution and Bylaws on file with the State of Oregon.  The business and affairs of OBRA are managed by its board of directors. There are six members of the Board of Directors. Each director is elected to a three-year term by a majority of club representatives at an annual meeting. Two directors are elected each year. As of January 2023, the chairwoman of the board is Stacy Westbrook, and the executive director is Chuck Kenlan. 

There are four paid positions:
Executive Director
Webmaster
Membership Coordinator
Equipment Manager

Types of racing 
OBRA sanctions events for six cycling disciplines.  They are road, track, criterium, time trial, cyclo-cross,  and the mountain bike disciplines of cross-country, downhill and super-d.

Reciprocity 
OBRA maintains a reciprocity agreement with Federation of Independent Associations of Cycling (FIAC), USA Cycling (USAC) and other organizations.  These agreements include honoring of memberships and/or suspensions, cooperation and production of programs.

References

External links 
 http://www.obra.org/

Cycle racing in the United States
Sports governing bodies in the United States
Organizations based in Oregon
Cycling in Oregon
Cycling organizations in the United States
1998 establishments in Oregon